Dimovo is a small village in the municipality of Smolyan, located in the Smolyan Province of southern Bulgaria. The village is located 166.88 km from Sofia. As of 2007, the village had a population of 11 people.

References

Villages in Smolyan Province